Merrick Bremner (born 26 March 1986) is a South African professional golfer. He plays on the Sunshine Tour, where he has won eight times.

Professional career
In 2012, Bremner led by two strokes after the first round of the SA Open Championship. He shot a course record 64 at Serengeti GC and eventually finished the tournament in a tie for 33rd after carding an 80 in the final round.

Bremner has also played on the European Tour where his best finish was T3 at the 2014 D+D Real Czech Masters.

Bremner played in his first major championship at the 2019 U.S. Open; he missed the halfway cut.

Professional wins (13)

Sunshine Tour wins (8)

Sunshine Tour playoff record (1–1)

IGT Pro Tour wins (5)

Results in major championships

CUT = missed the halfway cut

References

External links 

South African male golfers
Sunshine Tour golfers
European Tour golfers
Sportspeople from Durban
Sportspeople from Pretoria
White South African people
1986 births
Living people